

This is a list of the National Register of Historic Places listings in Akron, Ohio.

This is intended to be a complete list of the properties and districts on the National Register of Historic Places in Akron, Ohio, United States. Latitude and longitude coordinates are provided for many National Register properties and districts; these locations may be seen together in an online map.

There are 183 properties and districts listed on the National Register in Summit County, including 3 National Historic Landmarks. The city of Akron is the location of 60 of these properties and districts, including 2 of the National Historic Landmarks; they are listed here, while the 124 sites and 1 National Historic Landmark located elsewhere in Summit County are listed separately. One district, the Valley Railway Historic District, is split between Akron and other parts of the county, and is thus included on both lists.

Current listings

|}

See also

 List of National Historic Landmarks in Ohio
 National Register of Historic Places listings in Ohio

References

Akron
History of Akron, Ohio
Akron, Ohio